Naxos comprises numerous companies, divisions, imprints, and labels specializing in classical music but also audiobooks and other genres. The premier label is Naxos Records which focuses on classical music. Naxos Musical Group encompasses about 17 labels including Naxos Records, Naxos Audiobooks, and Naxos Books (ebooks). There are about an additional 50 labels that are independent of the Naxos Musical Group with a wide range of offerings.

The company was founded in 1987 by Klaus Heymann, a German-born resident of Hong Kong.

Naxos Records

Naxos Records is a record label specializing in classical music. The company was known for its budget pricing of discs, with simpler artwork and design than most other labels. In the 1980s, Naxos primarily recorded central and eastern European symphony orchestras, often with lesser-known conductors, as well as upcoming and unknown musicians, to minimize recording costs and maintain its budget prices.

In more recent years, Naxos has taken advantage of the expiring copyrights of other companies' studio recordings by selling discs remastered from gramophone records. Examples include the complete recordings of opera singers such as Enrico Caruso, Amelita Galli-Curci, and Titta Ruffo and the 1934 world première performance of Howard Hanson's opera Merry Mount. Legal restrictions prevented some of these recordings from being sold in the United States. Naxos has also recorded the music of contemporary composers, including Leonardo Balada, Bechara El-Khoury, Laurent Petitgirard, and Alla Pavlova. The label has branched out into jazz, world music, and books on musical subjects. Naxos Spoken Word Library contains non-music products, such as audiobooks and radio dramas.

In 2003, it began a paid subscription service for listening on the Internet that offers its complete catalogue and the Naxos Music Library. As of 2019, subscribers had access to 2,225,190 tracks on its 145,755 discs, though these numbers were increasing by nearly 100 new discs a day. In 2015, it launched a high-definition download and streaming service, ClassicsOnline HD•LL, with a catalogue drawn from a number of classical record labels.

Distribution
Naxos Global Logistics, based in Poing near Munich, was founded in 2008 to expand the services offered to its distributed labels, including manufacturing, marketing, and licensing.

Awards
In 2005, Naxos won the Label of the Year Award at Classic FM/Gramophone awards. In 2023, they won the Label of the Year Award at the International Classical Music Awards.

Other divisions
 ARC Music
 ArkivMusic
 Capriccio
 Dynamic
 Oehms Classics
 Ondine
 Orfeo

See also
 List of record labels
 Capitol Records v. Naxos of America, 2005 NY Slip Op 02570, 4 NY3d 540 (NY April 5, 2005)

References

External links

Capitol Records, Inc. v. Naxos of America, Inc. legal case

Classical music record labels
Jazz record labels
Hong Kong independent record labels
IFPI members
Record label distributors
Record labels established in 1987
Audiobook companies and organizations